is a single by the Japanese band Nico Touches the Walls from their second studio album, Aurora.
 
The single was released on November 4, 2009, and was used as the theme song for the TV Tokyo drama Bocho Mania 09, the band's first musical participation in a TV drama.

Music video
The music video for the song, released the same day, features Bocho Mania 09 actor Osamu Mukai. The video shows a young and distraught businessman who keeps seeing a goat's head, desperate, while he sings the song with the band.

Track list
 Kakera: Subete no Omoitachi e
 Aurora (Prelude)
 Hologram (Live)

Chart position
The single reached number 24 on the Oricon Chart in Japan.

References

 Nico Touches the Walls single: kakera  Retrieved August 27, 2011
 Kakera subete no omoitashi he  Retrieved August 27, 2011
 Kakera subete no omoitaiche he information Retrieved August 29, 2011

2009 singles
Nico Touches the Walls songs
2009 songs